The Autopista AP-7 (also called Autopista del Mediterráneo) is a Spanish autopista (controlled-access highway). It runs along the Mediterranean coast of Spain.

AP-7 has two different sections (911+96 km):
 From Els Límits (in La Jonquera municipality) to Vera: 911 km long. Main cities passed:
 Figueres
 Girona
 Sabadell
 Barcelona
 Tarragona
 Reus
 Salou
 Amposta
 Castelló de la Plana
 Sagunt
 Valencia
 Gandia
 Dénia
 Benidorm
 Alacant
 Elx
 Cartagena
 From Málaga to Guadiaro: 96 km long. Main cities passed:
 Torremolinos
 Benalmádena
 Fuengirola
 Marbella
 Estepona

Junctions

{| class="wikitable"
|- align="center" bgcolor="#19408B" style="color:white;font-size:120%;"
| colspan="3" | Autopista AP-7 junctions
|-
!scope=col| Southbound exits
!scope=col| Junction
!scope=col| Northbound exits
|- align="center"
| style=background:skyblue | Entering ,  and Girona Province
| rowspan=2 | Border 
| End of autopistaRoad continues as A9 towards Perpignan 
|- align="center"
| Start of autopista 
| style=background:skyblue | Entering 
|- align="center"
| La Jonquera NCustoms
| 1
|  No access (on-slip only)
|- align="center"
| bgcolor=#dcdcfe colspan=3 | Toll 
|- align="center"
| La Jonquera
| 2Services
| La JonqueraCustoms
|- align="center"
| Figueres N, Figueres-Vilafant , Roses
| 3
| Figueres N
|- align="center"
| Figueres S, Roses 
| 4
| Figueres S, Figueres-Vilafant , Roses
|- align="center"
| colspan=3 | L'Empordà Services
|- align="center"
| L'Escala, Empúries
| 5
| L'Escala, Empúries
|- align="center"
|  No access (on-slip only)
|
| Vilademuls, La Jonquera,  N-II
|- align="center"
| Girona N, Banyoles, Olot, Palamós, Palamós 
| 6
| Girona N, Olot, Banyoles
|- align="center"
| bgcolor=#ffdead| 
| bgcolor=#ffdead| 6A
| bgcolor=#ffdead| 
|- align="center"
| Girona O, Girona 
| 6B
| Girona O
|- align="center"
| Girona S, Sant Feliu de Guíxols
| 7
| Girona S, Girona 
|- align="center"
| Fornells de la Selva A-2, Barcelona N-II
|
|  No access (on-slip only)
|- align="center"
| colspan=3 | El Gironès Services
|- align="center"
| Girona–Costa Brava , CIM la Selva, Riudellots de la Selva, Cassà de la Selva, Vic C-25
| 8
| Girona–Costa Brava , CIM la Selva, Riudellots de la Selva, Cassà de la Selva, Vic C-25
|- align="center"
| Maçanet de la Selva, Lloret de Mar, Blanes, Malgrat de Mar C-35
| 9
| Maçanet de la Selva, Santa Coloma de Farners, Lloret de Mar, Sant Feliu de Guíxols, Palamós, Palamós  C-35
|- align="center"
| colspan=3 | La Selva Services
|- align="center"
| style=background:skyblue | Entering Barcelona Province
| 
| style=background:skyblue | Entering Girona Province
|- align="center"
| Hostalric
| 10
| Hostalric, Blanes
|- align="center"
| Sant Celoni, Montseny
| 11
| Sant Celoni, Montseny
|- align="center"
| colspan=3 | Montseny Services
|- align="center"
| Cardedeu, La Roca Village
| 12A
| Cardedeu, La Roca Village
|- align="center"
| La Roca del Vallès , Granollers E, Mataró C-60
| 12B
| La Roca del Vallès , Granollers E, Mataró C-60
|- align="center"
| bgcolor=#dcdcfe colspan=3 | Toll 
|- align="center"
| Granollers, Montornès del Vallès, Vilanova del Vallès
| 13
| Granollers, Montornès del Vallès, Vilanova del Vallès
|- align="center"
| Barcelona, Barcelona-El Prat  C-33
| 14TOTSO
| Parets, Vic, Puigcerdà C-17
|- align="center"
| Mollet del Vallès  C-17
| 15
| Mollet del Vallès , Parets, La Llagosta C-17
|- align="center"
| Mollet del Vallès N
| 16
| Mollet del Vallès N
|- align="center"
| Caldes de Montbui, CIM Vallès, Mollet del Vallès S C-59
| 17
| Caldes de Montbui, CIM Vallès, Mollet del Vallès S C-59
|- align="center"
| Santa Perpètua de Mogoda, Polinyà, Industrial area
| 18Services
| Santa Perpètua de Mogoda, Polinyà, Industrial area

See also
N-340 road (Spain)

External links
Autopista AP-7 Concessionaire - Cintra
Autopista AP-7 Concessionaire
Autopista AP-7 in Google Maps

Autopistas and autovías in Spain
Motorways in Catalonia
Transport in the Valencian Community
Transport in the Region of Murcia
Transport in Andalusia